Henry Fairweather may refer to:
 Henry C. Fairweather, land surveyor and town planner in Belize
 Henry Fairweather (cricketer), Scottish cricketer